Ma Lin (born December 25, 1989) is a Chinese-Australian table tennis player who has only a left arm.

Ma has won five Paralympic medals, four gold, in four Summer Paralympic Games, five world titles and eleven Asian titles in his sport. He was named the 2013 Male Para-Table Tennis Star during the ITTF Star Awards in January 2014.

Ma lost his right arm at age 5, after he went to the zoo with other children and stuck his arm in a cage to feed a bear. He sustained a knee injury in the 2014 World Para Table Tennis Championships in Beijing.

Move to Australia
Ma moved to Melbourne, Australia in 2017 or later.

He also registered with Table Tennis Australia, and competed in the Australian Open during the 2019 ITTF World Tour (with able-bodied athletes), losing his only match 0–4 to Thailand's Supanut Wisutmaythangkoon.

He represented Australia at the 2020 Tokyo Paralympics, where he won silver medals in Men's Singles C9-10 and Men's Team C9-10 with Nathan Pellissier and Joel Coughlan.

At the 2022 Commonwealth Games, he won the silver medal in the Men's singles C8–10.

References

External links
 

1989 births
Living people
Paralympic table tennis players of China
Paralympic table tennis players of Australia
Chinese male table tennis players
Table tennis players at the 2008 Summer Paralympics
Table tennis players at the 2012 Summer Paralympics
Table tennis players at the 2016 Summer Paralympics
Table tennis players at the 2020 Summer Paralympics
Medalists at the 2008 Summer Paralympics
Medalists at the 2012 Summer Paralympics
Medalists at the 2016 Summer Paralympics
Medalists at the 2020 Summer Paralympics
Paralympic medalists in table tennis
Paralympic silver medalists for Australia
People from Mudanjiang
Paralympic gold medalists for China
Paralympic silver medalists for China
Table tennis players from Heilongjiang
Chinese amputees
Chinese emigrants to Australia
FESPIC Games competitors
Naturalised citizens of Australia
Commonwealth Games silver medallists for Australia
Commonwealth Games medallists in table tennis
Table tennis players at the 2022 Commonwealth Games
Medallists at the 2022 Commonwealth Games